This is a list of people elected to the Legislative Assembly of the Gold Coast on 17 July 1956. The membership was maintained at 104.

Composition

List of MPs elected in the general election
General elections were held on to elect a parliament prior to the Gold Coast being granted independence from colonial rule by the United Kingdom. The new assembly was opened on 31 July 1956. A few days later, on 3 August 1956, a motion was passed by the new assembly authorising the government to request the government of the United Kingdom to enact an act of parliament to provide for the establishment of the Gold Coast as an independent sovereign nation with the name Ghana. This parliament would continue after the country becomes independent as the first parliament in the Republic

Changes
Kusasi Central constituency - In August 1957 Awuni joined the CPP and represented the constituency as a member of the CPP until 1965.
Ekumfi-Enyan constituency - 1958 - S. K. Otoo  was replaced by Kwaku Boateng in 1958 to represent the constituency in parliament.
Ho East constituency - March 1960 - The Ho East constituency was declared vacant in March 1960 when Rev. Ametowobla sought political asylum in Togo. The seat was subsequently occupied by Emmanuel Yaw Attigah of the CPP. Attigah remained MP for the constituency from 1960 to 1965.
Atwima Amansie - 1961 - Joe Appiah was arrested in 1961 and was replaced by Isaac Joseph Adomako-Mensah who had been the legislative member for the Atwima-Amansie electoral area from 1954 to 1956.
Eastern Nzima-Axim John Alicoe Kinnah of the CPP was the MP for this constituency by 1961.
Anlo South In February 1962, Daniel Apedoh, who was elected to replace Modesto Apaloo following his detention was himself among a number of opposition members of parliament arrested leaving only 6 opposition MPs in the 114 seat parliament.

By-elections
Berekum constituency - 25 April 1957 - A by-election was held due to the death of J. G. Awuah, the sitting CPP MP. The seat was won by Isaac William Benneh also of the CPP following Awuah's death.
Kumasi North constituency - 1959 - Cobina Kessie was appointed Ghana's ambassador to Liberia in 1959 and Daniel Emmanuel Asafo-Agyei was elected on the ticket of the CPP to replace him as the member of parliament for the Kumasi North constituency.
Kumasi South constituency - 1959 - Osei Owusu Afriyie of the CPP was elected MP in April 1959, replacing Edward Asafu-Adjaye.
June 1960 - There were a total of 10 women elected unopposed in this by-election. Three women, Susanna Al-Hassan, Ayanori Bukari and Victoria Nyarko became Members of Parliament representing the Northern Region. Grace Ayensu and Christiana Wilmot won the Western Region seats. The rest were Sophia Doku and Mary Koranteng, Eastern Region, Regina Asamany, Volta Region, Comfort Asamoah, Ashanti Region, and Lucy Anin, Brong Ahafo Region.
Accra Central - 1960 - Henry Sonnie Torgbor Provencal won the by-election held on 30 August 1960 to replace Dr. Kwame Nkrumah who had become head of state and no longer capable of representing his constituency, Accra Central in parliament. 
Ga Rural constituency - 1963 - Paul Tekio Tagoe won the by-election held on 12 February 1963 unopposed to become the MP for Ga Rural.
Akim Abuakwa West constituency (Kade-Akwatia) - 1964 - Michael Reynolds Darku-Sarkwa died in 1964 and was replaced by Kwesi Amoako-Atta who stood for the seat unopposed on the ticket of the CPP.

Notes and references

See also
 Parliament of Ghana
 1956 Gold Coast legislative election

External links and sources
African Elections Database

1956
Ghanaian MPs 1956–1965